Bunt may refer to:

People
 Darrell Bunt (1902–1977), Royal Navy chaplain
 Dick Bunt (1960–1921), American basketball player 
 Raymond Bunt (born 1944), Pennsylvania politician
 Bunt Stephens (John L. Stephens, 1889–1951), or Uncle Bunt, American old-time fiddle player
 BUNT., a German DJ, formerly as duo

Other uses
 Bunt (baseball), a batting technique
 Bunt (community), an Indian group from Kerala
 Bunt (sail), a part of a ship's sail
 Bunt Island, in Antarctica
 The Bunt, nickname of the Buntingford branch line in Hertfordshire, England
 Bunt, an aerobatic maneuver 

See also

 Bundt cake
 Bunting (bird)
 van de Bunt, a Dutch surname
 Bunt v Hallinan, 1985 case in New Zealand land law